Mathematical Pie is a British eight-page magazine published three times a year, and is aimed at mathematics students aged 10 to 14. It contains mathematical facts, puzzles, and challenges intended to aid teaching. It is published by the Mathematical Association, based in Leicester, and the current editor is Wil Ransome.

The magazine was created in 1950 by Roland Collins. From May 1956 to May 1967, the publication carried the first 10,022 digits of decimal expansion of pi across the bottom of each page of successive issues.

References

External links 
 Collection of issues 1-102

Student magazines published in the United Kingdom
Education magazines
Magazines established in 1950
Mathematics magazines
Mass media in Leicester
Triannual magazines published in the United Kingdom